G. M. Woodward may refer to:

George Moutard Woodward (1760–1809), English caricaturist and humor writer
Gertrude Mary Woodward (1854–1939), English scientific illustrator